Gyeongju World is a theme park in Gyeongju, Gyeongsangbuk-do, South Korea. Gyeongju World is composed of "X-Zone," "Snow Sled Garden," and "Wizard Garden." The X-Zone has rides such as the Phaethon, the Megadrop, the Tornado, and the Exploration of Grand Canyon. There are ski sleds, adult sleds, and children's sleighs in Snow Sled Garden. Wizard Garden is a children's area with a wide variety of children's rides.

Roller coasters

References

External links 
 
 Gyeongju World Official site : http://www.gjw.co.kr/

Amusement parks in South Korea
Amusement parks opened in 1985